Entity realism (also selective realism), sometimes equated with referential realism, is a philosophical position within the debate about scientific realism. It is a variation of realism (independently proposed by Stanford School philosophers Nancy Cartwright and Ian Hacking in 1983) that restricts warranted belief to only certain entities.

Overview
Whereas traditional scientific realism argues that our best scientific theories are true, or approximately true, or closer to the truth than their predecessors, entity realism does not commit itself to judgments concerning the truth of scientific theories. Instead, entity realism claims that the theoretical entities that feature in scientific theories, e.g. 'electrons', should be regarded as real if and only if they refer to phenomena that can be routinely used to create effects in domains that can be investigated independently. 'Manipulative success' thus becomes the criterion by which to judge the reality of (typically unobservable) scientific entities. As Ian Hacking, the main proponent of this formulation of entity realism, puts it (referring to an experiment he observed in a Stanford laboratory, where electrons and positrons were sprayed, one after the other, onto a superconducting metal sphere), "if you can spray them, then they are real."

Entity realism has been an influential position partly because it coincided with a general trend in philosophy of science, and science studies more generally, to downplay the role of theories and put more emphasis on experimentation and scientific practice. Thus, entity realism sometimes is also called instrumental realism or experimental realism.

Criticism
While many philosophers acknowledge the intuitive pull of entity realism, it has also been strongly criticised, both as being too restrictive (in that it ignores entities that are observable yet do not lend themselves to manipulation) and as being too permissive (to the extent that seemingly successful instances of manipulation may turn out to be spurious).

Stathis Psillos remarks that entity realism is indeed a realist position (since it defends the reality of unobservable entities), but it is a selective realist position, since "it restricts warranted belief to entities only, and suggests to fellow realists that they are wrong in claiming that the theoretical descriptions of these entities are approximately true." Psillos also remarks that to a certain extent "this scepticism about theories is motivated by none other than the argument from the pessimistic induction".

See also
 Semirealism, a similar position

Notes

References
Nancy Cartwright (1983). How the Laws of Physics Lie, Clarendon Press.
Ian Hacking (1983). Representing and Intervening, Introductory Topics in the Philosophy of Natural Science, Cambridge University Press.
Hans Lenk (2003). Grasping Reality: An Interpretation-Realistic Epistemology, World Scientific, ch. 8: pp. 132–49.

Metaphysics of science
Metatheory of science
Philosophical realism